Peleg Slocum (1654–1733) was a Quaker from Portsmouth, Rhode Island, he was a proprietor of Dartmouth, Massachusetts and sole owner of Cuttyhunk Island.

Life

Illicit activity 
Despite being known as an “honest publick [sic.] Friend,” Slocum was also known to be a smuggler and a profitable contraband trader, posing as being on religious missions, Slocum would use his boat to transport felonious goods. Slocum's criminal activity was so great that he was able to, at the age of 23, put up 2000 pounds to purchase a farm. Slocum also found himself on the wrong side of the law in white-collar, and religious situations. He was a defendant against a claim that he and other Dartmouth proprietors refused to divide land.  And he had eight of his sheep seized for refusing to contribute to build a Presbyterian Church.

Marriage 
Slocum married his wife Mary Holder, daughter of Christopher Holder a Quaker evangelist, in 1681.

Cuttyhunk island 
In 1693 Slocum obtained Cuttyhunk Island, a small island off of the Massachusetts Southeast coast, as well as the surrounding islands Nashawena and Penikese. Slocum purchased the island from the combined holdings of Ralph Earle Jr., his brother William, and Peleg Sanford. He reportedly used Cuttyhunk to graze sheep, since he didn't need walls to confine the flock.

Religion 
Slocum was known as a devout Quaker. He routinely held meetings of the local Friends in his Dartmouth home - all the way until 1703. He was one of the first approved Ministers of the society. Additionally, he was known to travel in his sloop to the island of Nantucket with the intent of converting locals to his faith. In 1698, along with several other Dartmouth Quakers, Slocum pledged money to help build a meeting house. His was the largest individual donation. £15. In 1699, the meeting house was built. The first in Old Dartmouth, where the Apponegansett Meeting House is now located. He would also routinely meet with Quakers in high regard. Including Thomas Story, and John Richardson.

References 

People from Portsmouth, Rhode Island
People of colonial Massachusetts
People of colonial Rhode Island
1654 births
1733 deaths